Ronald Arthur Stordahl is the founder of electronic component distributor Digi-Key Electronics, located in Thief River Falls, Minnesota. He previously served as chief executive officer but is now member of the board.

Early life
Ronald was born in Thief River Falls to Arthur Vernon (1909–2011) and Ina (Olson) Stordahl (1922–2020) in 1943. His paternal grandfather, Louis, was an immigrant from Flesberg, Buskerud, Norway.

Career
Stordahl's interest in ham radio provided the springboard for what became Digi-Key Electronics. While in college he assembled and began selling a digital electronic keyer kit for sending radiotelegraph code for ham radio operators. It was called the Digi-Key.

After obtaining his PhD in Electrical Engineering from the University of Minnesota, Stordahl returned to his hometown of Thief River Falls. The keyer kit was discontinued and he began selling electronic components in 1972. 

Digi-Key Electronics has become one of the fastest growing electronic component distributors in the world. The privately held company has annual sales of over $3 billion and employs over 4,000 people.

Stordahl holds the amateur radio callsign AE5E.

References

External links

Living people
University of Minnesota College of Science and Engineering alumni
American chief executives
American company founders
Amateur radio people
1943 births